Bagré may refer to:

Bagré Department, commune of Boulgou Province in Burkina Faso
Bagré (town), capital of the Bagré Department in Burkina Faso
Bagré dam, one of the largest dams in Burkina Faso, near the town of Bagré